Yehoshafat Harkabi (born 1921, Haifa; died 26 August 1994, Jerusalem) was chief of Israeli military intelligence from 1955 until 1959 and afterwards a professor of International Relations and Middle East Studies at the Hebrew University of Jerusalem.

Biography

Harkabi had a good command of Arabic, a deep knowledge of Arab civilization and history, and a solid understanding of Islam. He developed from an uncompromising hardliner to supporter of a Palestinian state who recognized the PLO as a negotiations partner. In his most well-known work Israel's Fateful Hour, Harkabi described himself as a "Machiavellian dove" intent on searching "for a policy by which Israel can get the best possible settlement of the conflict in the Middle East" (1988, p. xx) - a policy that would include a Zionism "of quality and not of acreage" (p. 225).

Harkabi was forced to resign as chief of Military Intelligence as a consequence of the 1959 Night of the Ducks.

Following his military career, Harkabi served as a visiting professor at Princeton University and guest scholar at the Brookings Institution. He was Maurice Hexter professor and director of the Leonard Davis Institute of International Relations and Middle East Studies at Hebrew University of Jerusalem.  He would earn a MPA from Harvard University in 1962.

Awards
In 1993, Harkabi was awarded the Israel Prize, for political science.

Published works
 Harkabi, Y. (1974). Arab Attitudes to Israel. Transaction Publishers. 
 Harkabi, Y. (1975). Palestinians and Israel. Transaction Publishers. 
 Harkabi, Y. (1977). Arab Strategies and Israel's Response. Free Press. 
 Harkabi, Y. (1978). Three Concepts of Arab Strategy. Anti-Defamation League of B'nai B'rith. ISBN B0006WY3PU
 Harkabi, Y. (1979). Palestinian Covenant and Its Meaning. Frank Cass Publishers. 
 Harkabi, Y. (1981). The Palestinian National Covenant (1968): An Israeli Commentary. ISBN B0007J3GFA
 Harkabi, Y. (1982). The Bar Kokhba Syndrome: Risk and Realism in International Relations. New York, NY, Rossel Books. 
 Harkabi, Y. (1985). Al Fatah's Doctrine. In The Israel-Arab Reader: A Documentary History of the Middle East Conflict. T. W. Laqueur and B. Rubin (Eds.). New York, NY, Penguin Books. 
 Harkabi, Y. (1988). Israel's Fateful Decisions. I.B. Tauris. 
 Harkabi, Y. (1989). Israel's Fateful Hour. HarperCollins.  (Chapter 5: Nationalistic Judaism)
 Harkabi, Y. (1992). The Arab-Israeli Conflict on the Threshold of Negotiations. Center of International Studies, Princeton University.

See also 
List of Israel Prize recipients

References

External links 
 On Making Peace Despite the Risks - Ze'ev Schiff
   Heads of A'man, Mossad, & Shin Bet

1921 births
1994 deaths
Israeli generals
20th-century Israeli Jews
Israel Prize in political science recipients
Jews in Mandatory Palestine
Writers on antisemitism
Burials at Mount Herzl
Directors of the Military Intelligence Directorate (Israel)
Mandatory Palestine military personnel of World War II
Jewish Brigade personnel
People from Haifa
Hebrew Reali School alumni
Academic staff of the Hebrew University of Jerusalem
Princeton University faculty
Brookings Institution people
Arabic-speaking people
Harvard Kennedy School alumni